Rudolf Pohl (5 November 1924 – 1 December 2021) was a German Catholic prelate, musician, and choral conductor based at the Aachen Cathedral, where he led the Aachener Domchor to international recognition and revived a school for its boys' choir. He edited sacred music by Johannes Mangon, who had worked at the Cathedral in the 16th century.

Life and career 
Born in Aachen, Pohl attended the  there. He was a member of the Aachener Domchor at the Aachen Cathedral from 1935 to 1942. After his Abitur he had to serve in the Wehrmacht and became a prisoner-of-war in Cherbourg. He was consecrated as a priest in 1951, and worked as a chaplain in Krefeld. He continued his studies, now of musicology, at the University of Bonn from 1954 to 1959.

In 1954, Pohl was called to the Aachen Cathedral by Domkapellmeister . The tradition of a boys' choir at the cathedral dates back to the time of Charlemagne. A school was founded in 1960, which grew into a private Grundschule for boys.

Simultaneously, Pohl was promoted to the doctorate at the Bonn University, supervised by Josef Ratzinger. His dissertation dealt with the sacred choral music by Johannes Mangon who had worked at the Aachen Cathedral in the 16th century. Pohl would later edit his works and perform them. He belonged to the team organising the 111. Niederrheinisches Musikfest in Aachen in 1957, along with Rehmann, Wolfgang Sawallisch,  and others. After Rehmann's sudden death in 1963, Bishop  appointed him as director of the Aachener Domchor and Domkapellmeister. He improved the choir's quality, including the boys from the Domsingschule, leading them to international recognition by tours in Germany, Belgium, the Netherlands, Ireland, France, Italy, Poland, Czechoslovakia, Switzerland, Austria, England, Spain and Israel. Programs included masses, oratorios and Passions, also in recordings, and radio and television broadcasts of services from the cathedral.

In 1985, Pohl was rewarded for his merits in applying the changes of the Second Vatican Council; on the 8th International Congress of church music in Rome, he was elected president of the Consociatio Internationalis Musicae Sacrae (CIMS), a papal organisation for church music. A year later, he retired as Domkapellmeister, succeeded by Hans-Josef Roth.

Pohl initiated a foundation, the Rudolf-Pohl-Stiftung, for the instrumental education of the Domsingknaben, providing them with quality instruments.

Pohl died in Kelmis on 1 December 2021, at age 97.

Publications

As editor 
 
Pohl edited works by Johannes Mangon, with comments and a transcription into modern practice:

Recordings
 Josquin des Prez, Johann Joseph Fux, Tomás Luis de Victoria, Ave Maria Kaiserin music in Aachen cathedral. Rudolf Pohl, Aachener Domchor. Sony BMG music entertainment 2005 (Deutsche Harmonia mundi, 1972).

Awards 

 2002 Order of Merit of the Federal Republic of Germany

References

Further reading 
 Hüter eines ungewöhnlichen Schatzes. Zum 65. Geburtstag von CIMS-Präsident Prälat Dr. Rudolf Pohl. In: Musica Sacra. year 109, issue 6, November/December 1989.

External links 
 Rudolf Pohl (Choral Conductor) Bach Cantatas Website

1924 births
2021 deaths
20th-century German Roman Catholic priests
21st-century German Roman Catholic priests
Officers Crosses of the Order of Merit of the Federal Republic of Germany
University of Bonn alumni
People from Aachen
German prisoners of war in World War II